"Talk to Me" is a song written by Kenneth "Babyface" Edmonds. The track features Eric Clapton on guitar and was released in 1996 on the album The Day. A live performance featuring Clapton on was released in 1997 on the album MTV Unplugged NYC 1997.

Just before performing the song with Clapton for the MTV Unplugged session, Edmonds explained how the song came about: "This is a song that I was working on when we worked together on Change the World. He started playing guitar and I started smelling neck bone, grits and greens and things. So we did this song called 'Talk to Me'."

Personnel and credits
Credits adapted from album liner notes.

Babyface – writer, producer, lead vocals, keyboards, programming, acoustic guitar
Eric Clapton - guitar
Michael Thompson – guitar
Nathan East - bass
John Robinson – drums
Sheila E – percussion
De De O’Neal, Marc Nelson, Shanice Wilson – background vocals

Brad Gilderman, Adam Kagan, Thom Russo – engineers
Paul Boutin, Greg Collins, Tim Lauber – assistant engineers
Tim Hoogenakker, John Hurlbut, Rafa Sardina, Peter Doell – assistant engineers
Jon Gass – mixer
Kyle Bess – assistant mix engineer
Randy Walker – programmer
Eddy Shreyer - mastering

Charts

References

Eric Clapton songs
Babyface (musician) songs
1996 songs
Songs written by Babyface (musician)